Ralph Alexander Citarella (born February 7, 1958) is a former Major League Baseball pitcher.  The right-hander was drafted by the St. Louis Cardinals in the 1st round (12th pick) of the 1979 amateur draft (Secondary Phase), and he played for the Cardinals (1983–1984) and Chicago White Sox (1987).

On September 13, 1983, Citarella made his major league debut in relief at Three Rivers Stadium. He struck out the first batter he faced, catcher Tony Peña, in the 7th inning. In 1.2 innings that night he gave up one hit (a double to Johnny Ray) and one earned run, and the Cards lost, 6–0.

Citarella was successful in his two short stints with St. Louis, posting ERAs  of 1.64 and 3.63, but didn't fare as well with the White Sox in 1987.  In five appearances, he gave up nine earned runs in eleven innings, including four home runs. He retired in 1988 due to being bounced around in the minors.

In three seasons he appeared in a total of 21 games and had a 0–1 record, 2 starts, 0 complete games, and 6 games finished. In 44.1 innings pitched he gave up 20 earned runs for an ERA of 4.06, and had a strikeout-to-walk ratio of 2-to-1. (28 strikeouts and 14 walks)

Citarella made his first ever MLB start on June 23rd 1984, a nationally televised NBC Game of the Week at Wrigley Field versus the Chicago Cubs. The high- scoring extra inning affair came to be known as "The Sandberg Game,' who homered twice to tie the game late against Bruce Sutter. 

In 2006, Ralph Citarella became the Athletic Relations Liaison for the Habana Joe Trading Company, for its Dock to Dine Men's clothing line. From 2012 to 2013, Citarella served as the pitching coach for the New Jersey based Newark Bears of the independent Can-Am League.

References

Baker, Chris (July 12, 1984). "Sandberg takes Cubs with him on a ride to the top". Eugene Register-Guard. (Oregon). (Los Angeles Times). p. 5B.

External links
, or Retrosheet, or  Pura Pelota (Venezuelan Winter League)

1958 births
Living people
Arkansas Travelers players
Baseball players from New Jersey
Chicago White Sox players
Eastern Florida State College people
El Paso Diablos players
Florida Southern Moccasins baseball players
Fresno Suns players
Gastonia Cardinals players
Hawaii Islanders players
Johnson City Cardinals players
Louisville Redbirds players
Major League Baseball pitchers
Minor league baseball coaches
Navegantes del Magallanes players
American expatriate baseball players in Venezuela
Sportspeople from East Orange, New Jersey
Portland Beavers players
Springfield Redbirds players
St. Louis Cardinals players
St. Petersburg Cardinals players
Tacoma Tigers players
Tigres de Aragua players